State Route 266 is a west–east thoroughfare completely within Salt Lake County in northern Utah that connects both sides of the I-215 beltway. It is known as 4500 South and 4700 South along the route.

Route description

SR-266 begins at a partial cloverleaf interchange with I-215 in Taylorsville and travels east on 4700 South. After passing through the center of Taylorsville and an intersection with SR-68, the highway veers northeast near the Fore Lakes Golf Course and passes through residential neighborhoods and an office park. It continues east onto 4500 South, crossing over the Jordan River into Murray and intersecting I-15 in a single-point urban interchange. SR-266 then descends into a trenched highway, crossing under a mainline railroad carrying freight traffic and FrontRunner commuter trains, a driveway, and the TRAX light rail near Murray North station. The highway then intersects US-89 before continuing into Murray's suburban neighborhoods, passing several parks and sportsfields. SR-266 enters Holladay and veers slightly to the north before ascending into the Holladay Hills, where it intersects I-215 again and terminates.

The entire route is included as part of the National Highway System.

History
The State Road Commission designated SR-266 in 1959 as a mostly-proposed roadway, connecting SR-68 and SR-71 with a planned interchange on I-15. The corresponding section of SR-174, just to the south, was removed from the state highway system, as it would not give access to I-15. The state legislature extended the route west and east to both sides of the I-215 loop in 1969.

Major intersections

References

266
 266
Streets in Utah